The East Side Union High School District (abbreviated as ESUHSD) is a school district in San Jose, California, serving the East Side of San Jose. ESUHSD administers 19 high schools with a combined enrollment of approximately 24,500 students in the area of San Jose, Santa Clara County, California. The schools include 11 comprehensive or traditional and 7 alternative high school programs. An Adult Education Program serves an additional 26,000 students.

Schools in service
The district currently operates the following high schools (Data entered from California Department of Education SARC reports):

Employee housing proposal
In 2019 the district proposed to voters a housing complex for teachers because of the high cost of living in the area. Construction was tentatively to begin in 2022 if the measure was approved.

References

External links